Wayne "Moose" Henwood (born 15 October 1962) is a former Australian rules footballer who played for Sydney and Melbourne in the Victorian/Australia Football League (VFL/AFL).

Henwood started his career at South Fremantle where he played from 1981 to 1984. He then transferred to Glenelg and appeared in their 1985 and 1986 premiership teams. Sydney recruited him for the 1987 VFL season and he played all possible 24 games in his first year, including two finals.

A centre half forward or defender, Henwood represented Western Australia 4 times including the 1988 Adelaide Bicentennial Carnival state of origin. He also represented South Australia and Northern Territory. He crossed to his fourth state in 1992 when he joined Melbourne but time ran out and he could only manage one game.

The Glenelg premiership player then become a barrister and since 2007 has been a member of the AFL Tribunal and anti-doping tribunal notably as one of three tribunal members on the Essendon drug saga.

References

External links

Demon Wiki profile

1962 births
Living people
Sydney Swans players
Melbourne Football Club players
Glenelg Football Club players
South Fremantle Football Club players
Western Australian State of Origin players
Australian rules footballers from Western Australia